Fábio de Jesus Carmo Santos (born 4 May 1994) is a Portuguese footballer who plays for Clube União Culatrense, as a defender.

Football career
On 9 January 2013, Santos made his professional debut with Olhanense in a 2012–13 Taça da Liga match against Moreirense.

References

External links

Stats and profile at LPFP 

1994 births
Living people
Portuguese footballers
Association football defenders
S.C. Olhanense players
People from Olhão
Sportspeople from Faro District